The 2019 Nigerian Senate election in Bauchi State was held on February 23, 2019, to elect members of the Nigerian Senate to represent Bauchi State. Lawal Yahaya Gumau representing Bauchi South, Jika Dauda Halliru representing Bauchi Central and Adamu Muhammad Bulkachuwa representing Bauchi North all won on the platform of All Progressives Congress.

Overview

Summary

Results

Bauchi South 
A total of 18 candidates registered with the Independent National Electoral Commission to contest in the election. APC candidate Lawal Yahaya Gumau won the election, defeating PDP candidate, Dahiru Garba and 16 other party candidates. Gumau scored 250,725 votes, while  PDP candidate Garba scored 175,527 votes.

Bauchi Central 
A total of 15 candidates registered with the Independent National Electoral Commission to contest in the election. APC candidate Halliru Dauda Jika won the election, defeating PDP candidate Hammah Issah and 13 other party candidates. Jika pulled 128,871 votes, while PDP candidate Issah scored 57,069.

Bauchi North 
A total of 11 candidates registered with the Independent National Electoral Commission to contest in the election. APC candidate Adamu Bulkachuwa won the election, defeating PDP candidate and incumbent, Suleiman Nazif. Bulkachuwa pulled 110,631 votes while his closest rival Mustapha Farouk of NNRP pulled 92,140 votes.

References 

Bauchi State senatorial elections
Bauchi State Senate elections